Pilosocereus magnificus is a species of plant in the family Cactaceae. It is endemic to Brazil, within Minas Gerais state.  Its natural habitats are subtropical or tropical dry forests, subtropical or tropical dry shrubland, and rocky areas. It is threatened by habitat loss.

References

magnificus
Cacti of South America
Endemic flora of Brazil
Flora of Minas Gerais
Near threatened flora of South America
Taxonomy articles created by Polbot